Georges Creek is a  long 4th order tributary to the Monongahela River in Fayette County, Pennsylvania.

Variant names
According to the Geographic Names Information System, it has also been known historically as: 
 George Creek
 George's Creek
 Georges Run

Course
Georges Creek forms at the confluence of Askon Hollow and White Oak Hollow about 0.5 miles east of Fairchance in Fayette County.  Georges Creek then flows southwesterly to meet the Monongahela River at New Geneva, Pennsylvania.

Watershed
Georges Creek drains  of area, receives about 44.9 in/year of precipitation, has a topographic wetness index of 370.59, and has an average water temperature of 10.50 °C.  The watershed is 58% forested.

Additional Images

References

Rivers of Pennsylvania
Rivers of Fayette County, Pennsylvania
Tributaries of the Monongahela River
Allegheny Plateau